Events in the year 1489 in Portugal.

Incumbents
King of Portugal and the Algarves: John II

Events
1 March - Creation of the Marquis of Vila Real title of nobility 
First printed book.
Establishment of the Graciosa fortress

See also
History of Portugal (1415–1578)

References

 
Portugal
Years of the 15th century in Portugal
1489 by country